Stefan Groothuis (born 23 November 1981) is a Dutch retired speed skater. He is the World Sprint Champion for 2012 and the gold medal winner in the 1000 metres at the 2014 Winter Olympics.

Career
Groothuis, a specialist in the middle distances (1000 and 1500 metres), had his international breakthrough in 2005. In that year he reached a second spot during the Speed Skating World Cup meeting in Salt Lake City competing in the 1000 metres. This earned him a nomination for the 2006 Winter Olympics in Turin. During the Dutch Single Distance Championships in December 2005, he switched this nomination into a qualification by placing fourth behind Jan Bos, Erben Wennemars, and Beorn Nijenhuis, who all qualified as well.

In January, 2006, Groothuis surprisingly became the Dutch national sprint champion, finishing first in two 500 metres and two 1000 metres races, outsprinting common names like Gerard van Velde, Nijenhuis, and Wennemars. A month later at the 2006 Winter Olympics, Groothuis would finish in eighth position in the 1000 metres. His time of 1:09.57 was 0.68 behind the winner Shani Davis.

In the 2010-2011 World Cup season, Groothuis would win the 1000 metre overall World Cup, dethroning perennial winner Shani Davis. He would also lead the 2011-2012 1000 metre standings going into the final race, but would be beaten out in the season finale by Davis and also just edged for the season 1000 title by Davis as a result.

At the 2012 World Sprint Speed Skating Championships in Calgary, Groothuis won the gold medal. His point total of 136.810 broke the world record for the sprint combination held by Jeremy Wotherspoon. He also won gold in the 1000 metres at the World Single Distance Championships that year.

Personal records

Source: SpeedskatingResults.com

World record

Tournament overview

source:

World Cup overview

 – = Did not participate
(b) = Division B
 DQ = Disqualified
DNF = Did not finish

Medals won

Career highlights
 2001, 6th, Junior World Championships
 2002, 6th, 1000 metres, Dutch National Single Distance Championships
 2002, 7th, Dutch National Sprint Championships
 2003, 4th, 1000 metres and 8th, 500 metres, Dutch National Single Distance Championships
 2003, 6th, Dutch National Sprint Championships
 2004, 6th, 500 metres and 9th, 1000 metres, Dutch National Single Distance Championships
 2004, 8th, Dutch National Sprint Championships
 2005, 5th, 1500 metres; 6th, 500 metres; and 7th, 1000 metres; Dutch National Single Distance Championships
 2005, 4th, Dutch National Sprint Championships
 2006, 4th, 1000 metres and 8th, 1500 metres, Dutch National Single Distance Championships
 2006, 1st, Dutch National Sprint Championships
 2006, 8th, 1000 metres, 2006 Winter Olympics
 2006, 9th, 1000 metres, World Cup
 2007, 2nd, 1000 metres; 6th, 500 metres; and 8th, 1500 metres; Dutch National Single Distance Championships
 2014, 1st, 1000 metres, 2014 Winter Olympics
Source: www.sskating.com

References

External links
 
 Stefan Groothuis at SpeedSkatingStats.com
 
 
 Stefan Groothuis at SchaatsStatistieken.nl 
 

1981 births
Dutch male speed skaters
Speed skaters at the 2006 Winter Olympics
Speed skaters at the 2010 Winter Olympics
Speed skaters at the 2014 Winter Olympics
Olympic speed skaters of the Netherlands
People from Brummen
Living people
Medalists at the 2014 Winter Olympics
Olympic medalists in speed skating
Olympic gold medalists for the Netherlands
World Single Distances Speed Skating Championships medalists
World Sprint Speed Skating Championships medalists
20th-century Dutch people
21st-century Dutch people
Sportspeople from Gelderland